Gift of Faith may refer to:

Fidei donum, "The gift of faith" List of encyclicals of Pope Pius XII
A Gift of Faith, book by Sarah Price (author)
The Gift of Faith, a book by Donald Wuerl
"Gift of Faith", a song by Toto from the album Tambu